Qualification will be primarily based on the FIE Official Ranking as of April 2, 2012, with further individual places available at 4 zonal qualifying tournaments. Teams will be composed of 3 fencers. For teams to qualify they must be ranked in the top 16, if a continent is not ranked in the top 16 the next best placed country will take their spot.

Summary

Qualification timeline

Qualification

Men’s Individual Épée

Men’s Team Foil

Men’s Individual Foil

Men’s Team Sabre

No African country was in the top 16 of the World Rankings.

Men’s Individual Sabre

Women’s Team Épée

No African country was in the top 16 of the World Rankings.

Women’s Individual Épée

Women’s Team Foil

Women’s Individual Foil

Women’s Individual Sabre

** Up to 8 fencers spread across any team or individual events, additional to any qualifiers

References

Qualification for the 2012 Summer Olympics